The Nationalist Peace Party (Turkish: Milliyetçi Barış Partisi) is a political party in Northern Cyprus without parliamentary representation. 

Political parties in Northern Cyprus
Nationalist parties in Europe